Miguel Emmanuelli (17 September 1927 – June 1980) was a Puerto Rican sports shooter. He competed in the 25 metre pistol event at the 1956 Summer Olympics.

References

External links
 

1927 births
1980 deaths
People from Arecibo, Puerto Rico
Puerto Rican male sport shooters
Olympic shooters of Puerto Rico
Shooters at the 1956 Summer Olympics
Place of birth missing